Donghe Subdistrict is a subdistrict in Jishou, Hunan, China.  it had a population of 55,000 and an area of . It is surrounded by Majing'ao Town on the north, Taiping Town and Hexi Town on the east, and Zhenxi Subdistrict on the south.

Administrative division
The subdistrict is divided into 18 villages and 9 communities: Xitou Village, Zhenwuying Village, Baiguoping Village, Shanglao Village, Linmushan Village, Yanzhai Village, Xiaoxi Village, Wangjiang'ao Village, Zhangmuxi Village, Huiguang Village, Shuguang Village, Ma'ao Village, Lixi Village, Zhuangjia Village, Qinfeng Village, Aiban Village, Zhaiyang Village, Hequn Village, Donghe Community, Guangming Community, Wulibei Community, Xinqiao Community, Rongzhuang Community, Tongyouping Community, Datian Community, Longquan Community, and Xiangyang Community.

Transportation
 National Highway: G209 and G319
 Provincial Highway: S1828

References

Divisions of Jishou